The 1997 East Carolina Pirates football team was an American football team that represented East Carolina University as a member of Conference USA during the 1997 NCAA Division I-A football season. In their sixth season under head coach Steve Logan, the team compiled a 5–6 record. The Pirates offense scored 214 points while the defense allowed 298 points.

Schedule

References

East Carolina
East Carolina Pirates football seasons
East Carolina Pirates football